A crochet hook (or crochet needle) is an implement used to make loops in thread or yarn and to interlock them into crochet stitches. It is a round shaft pointed on one end, with a lateral groove behind it. The point eases the insertion of the hook through the material being crocheted and the groove makes it possible to pull a loop back through the material. The shaft is then divided into a working area that determines the hook's nominal diameter and ensures the uniform sizing of the loops formed on it, and a handle.

Construction

Crochet appeared as a distinct textile art during the early 19th century, and many crochet hooks survive from that period. These can be sorted into two groups, the one with thin steel hooks that are set into separate handles, and the other including single-piece hooks made in a variety of materials. The distinction between steel and other hooks persists to the present day, although all are now commonly of single-piece construction. A variety of coverings may be applied to the handle for ergonomic reasons. Ornate handles have been made for their decorative value, throughout.

Crochet hooks are currently produced in diameters ranging from 0.35 mm to 25 mm. These diameters are indicated both directly in millimeters and by various numerical or literal gauge systems. Hooks under 2.0 mm are made of steel (for its strength) and are alternately termed steel-, lace- or thread hooks. Hooks of 2.00 mm or larger diameter are called yarn hooks or regular hooks. Aluminum is the predominant material from 2.0 mm to 6.0 mm (for its lighter weight). Beyond that, bamboo, wood, and plastic are the more common materials (for their even lighter weight). The indicated size boundaries between the types are, however, approximate. With the exception of the thinnest hooks, which are invariably made of steel, other materials may be encountered outside the indicated ranges.

Historical materials for handles and some one-piece hooks include bone, porcupine quill, celluloid, agate, ivory, and fossilized mammoth ivory.

Longer hooks are used for Tunisian crochet to accommodate the lengthy rows of open loops characterizing that style. A form with hooks at both ends is also used for Tunisian and other types of crochet that cannot be made with the standard hook, such as cro-hooking.

Hook Sizes

Please refer to List of United States standard crochet hook and knitting needle sizes for a comparison chart of crochet hook sizes.

Types
A Knook is a type of crochet hook whose one end is a crochet hook and the other end has an eye-hole for attaching a cord. The cord allows for placing multiple live knit and purl stitches on the hook, which are then slid off and onto the cord when going to the next row.

Use

The two basic ways of holding a crochet hook are:

 the pencil grip, with the hook going over the crotch of the thumb, resembling a pencil,
 the knife grip, with the hook under the palm of the hand, resembling a knife held when held overhand.

These grips are functionally equivalent and selected as a matter of personal preference, with hybrid forms being commonplace.

Other applications

Crochet hooks can be used in many instances where it is necessary to pull a string through a hole. For example, many knitters use them to fix dropped knitting stitches, and tailors may use a crochet hook to thread a drawstring through its casing. Their use is not limited to fiber arts; crochet hooks can be used to maintain dreadlocks by pulling stray hairs back into the main dread.

See also

 Buttonhook
 Hook gauge

References

External links

Crochet

de:Häkelnadel